StarRoc was an American entertainment company. The company operated a full service record label and music publishing house. It was founded in 2008 by American rapper Jay-Z and Norwegian record production team Mikkel S. Eriksen and Tor Erik Hermansen of the production duo Stargate. The label was a 50/50 partnership between Stargate and Jay-Z's Roc Nation entertainment company, which he signed in the same year to Live Nation. StarRoc, during its time, was headquartered at Jay-Z's recording studio, Roc the Mic, in Manhattan, New York City, United States.

Roster

Former artists
Alexis Jordan

Discography

Studio albums
 Alexis Jordan (2011)

Singles
"Acid Rain" Alexis Jordan (2013)
"Good Girl" Alexis Jordan (2011)
"Happiness" Alexis Jordan (2010)
"How You Like Me Now" Alexis Jordan
"Hush Hush" Alexis Jordan

See also
 Stargate
 Roc Nation
 List of record labels

References

External links 
 Official Website

Jay-Z
 
2008 establishments in New York City
Companies based in Manhattan
Contemporary R&B record labels
Hip hop record labels
Music publishing companies of the United States
New York (state) record labels
Pop record labels
Publishing companies established in 2008
Record labels established in 2008